Haidian Wuluju is a station on Line 6 of the Beijing Subway. It was opened on December 30, 2012. The station was the terminus of the line until it was extended west to Jin'anqiao on December 30, 2018.

Station Layout 
The platform of this station is a Spanish-style platform layout. The side platforms on both sides are for passengers to get off, and the middle island platform is for passengers to get on. With the opening of the west extension of Line 6 to Jin'anqiao Station, the station only retains island platforms for getting on and off passengers, while the original two side platforms are closed.

Exits 
There are 4 exits, lettered A, B, C, and D. Exit D is accessible.

Gallery

References

Railway stations in China opened in 2012
Beijing Subway stations in Haidian District